Low power may refer to:
 Radio transmitters that send out relatively little power:
 QRP operation, using "the minimum power necessary to carry out the desired communications", in amateur radio.
 Cognitive radio transceivers typically automatically reduce the transmitted power to much less than the power required for reliable one-way broadcasts.
 Low-power broadcasting that the power of the broadcast is less, i.e. the radio waves are not intended to travel as far as from typical transmitters. 
 Low-power communication device, a radio transmitter used in low-power broadcasting.
 Low-power electronics, the consumption of electric power is deliberately low, e.g. notebook processors.
 Power (statistics), in which low power is due to small sample sizes or poorly designed experiments

See also
 Power (disambiguation)